Saju Muntasher is a Bangladeshi actor and producer. He is the CEO of 1952 Entertainment Ltd. He was elected general secretary of Television Program Producers Association of Bangladesh in 2019.

Early life
Saju Muntasher was born on 1 January 1977 in Pirojpur, Bangladesh. His father is Obaidul kabir & mother Kanij Najnin Akter.

Career
He started his career as a ramp model in 1997. From 2000 to 2002 he performed as a model in various TVC.
He made his acting debut in Bangla drama in 2002 directed by popular director Ahmed Yousuf Saber. Up to 2015 he has acted more than one hundred fifty dramas.
Besides acting, he was the founder of Hoi Choi Production House. This production house made more than 100 single drama, telefilms & tele movies. He also produced 20 serial drama through this production house. 

After that he started a new company   1952 Entertainment Ltd. and he is the CEO of the company. From this company he is producing television drama, films & non fictions events. 

He was elected general secretary of Television Program Producers Association of Bangladesh in 2019.

Personal life
Saju married to Fahima Ferdousi Sonia in 2017. She is a doctor by profession.

Filmography

Jury Member of Program 

 Binodon Bichitra-2011 -  Photo Sundori Juri Member
 Fair and Handsome – The Ultimate Man Powered By Bangladesh NAVY 2013 Turbo Judge

Awards 

 TRUB Award-2021 
CJFB Performance Award-2019
 Binodon Bichitra - 2010 - Best Drama Producer

References

External links
 

1977 births
Bangladeshi male actors
Bangladeshi television directors
Bangladeshi male models
People from Pirojpur District
Living people